Vernes may refer to:

People
Henri Vernes (1918–2021), Belgian writer
Jacob Vernes (1728–1791), Swiss theologian and Protestant pastor
Richárd Vernes (born 1992), Hungarian footballer

Places
Vernes, Trøndelag, a village in Agdenes municipality in Trøndelag county, Norway

See also
Verne (disambiguation)